Daemon is the sixth full-length studio album by Norwegian black metal band Mayhem. Their major label debut, it was released by Century Media Records on 25 October 2019 in digital formats while a manufacturing problem delayed the physical release until 8 November 2019.

Background and promotion
The band went into the studio not long after the De Mysteriis Dom Sathanas Alive anniversary tour in which the band played the iconic debut album in its entirety for various dates around the world. Many critics suggested the tour was highly influential to the sound of Daemon with many comparing it to that album. The album was also released on the back of the Lords of Chaos semi-biopic movie, giving the band a boost in popularity and interest.

During promotional interviews for the album, Necrobutcher claimed he was "On [his] way to kill Euronymous but Varg beat [him] to it", and also claimed that the Norwegian Police were aware of Vikernes' plot to kill Euronymous, stating: "But little did I know that the Norwegian police already knew that Count Grishnackh [Varg] was going down also to kill him. Because they bugged his phone, and he actually talked about this killing before he went to Bergen so the cops already knew that he was coming, so they probably were thinking to themselves, ‘We didn’t nail this guy for the church burnings, so let’s nail him for murder, and get rid of this f–king guy in Oslo the same time.’ So that’s basically what happened." He provided no evidence for this accusation against the Norwegian Police.

The bonus disc for the album features a cover of "Disgusting Semla" from former vocalist Dead's pre-Mayhem band Morbid.

Reception
Daemon was met with excellent reviews by critics upon release. Loudersound awarded it 4.5 out of 5 and strongly compared it to the band's debut album De Mysteriis Dom Sathanas. Metal Storm awarded it a 7.8 out of 10 calling it a return to form and "leaving behind the experimental and dissonant sound" of earlier releases. Consequence of Sound awarded the album an A− calling it a "return to form". Blabbermouth.net awarded it a 9 out of 10. Sputnikmusic were more critical, awarding it only 3.0 out of 5, stating "Daemon is a solid dose of black metal, and not much else".

Track listing

Limited Edition CD bonus tracks

Limited Edition Vinyl bonus disc

Personnel
Mayhem
Attila Csihar - lead vocals
Teloch - guitars, engineering (bass)
Ghul - guitars
Necrobutcher - bass guitar
Hellhammer - drums

Additional personnel
Necromorbus - producer, mixing, engineering
Thomas "PLEC" Johansson - mastering
Daniel Valeriani - album artwork

Charts

References

2019 albums
Mayhem (band) albums